Casas Nuevas Airport  is an airstrip serving the city of Jiquilisco in Usulután Department, El Salvador.

See also

Transport in El Salvador
List of airports in El Salvador

References

External links
 OpenStreetMap - Casas Nuevas
 HERE/Nokia - Casas Nuevas
 FalllingRain - Casas Nuevas Airport

Airports in El Salvador